A pops orchestra is an orchestra that plays popular music (generally traditional pop) and show tunes as well as well-known classical works. Pops orchestras are generally organised in large cities and are distinct from the more "highbrow"  symphony or philharmonic orchestras which also may exist in the same city. This is not to say that the distinction is complete; many symphony orchestras (for instance, the Detroit Symphony Orchestra, Buffalo Philharmonic Orchestra, and Kansas City Symphony) put on pops performances with some regularity, while other pops orchestras are actually second identities of the "highbrow" orchestra and composed largely of the same players (for instance, the Boston Pops Orchestra is composed primarily of Boston Symphony Orchestra members).

In the United Kingdom
 English Pops Orchestra
 Welsh Pops Orchestra

In the United States
 American Pops Orchestra
 Atlanta Pops Orchestra
 Austin Pops
 Binghamton Philharmonic
 Bob Lappin and The Palm Beach Pops
 Boston Pops Orchestra
 Buffalo Philharmonic Orchestra
 Carolina Pops Orchestra
 Chattanooga Pops
 Cincinnati Pops Orchestra
 Cleveland Pops Orchestra
 Dallas Pops
 Davenport Pops Orchestra
 Denver Pops Orchestra
 Detroit Symphony Orchestra
 Golden State Pops Orchestra
 Harvard Pops Orchestra 
 Hollywood Bowl Orchestra
 Indianapolis Symphony Orchestra
 Indian River Pops Orchestra
 Minneapolis Pops Orchestra
 National Symphony Orchestra
 The New York Pops
 Orlando Pops Orchestra
 Panama City POPS Orchestra
 Pasadena POPS
 Philly Pops
 Reno Pops Orchestra
 Salt Lake Pops Orchestra
 San Francisco Pops Orchestra
 Tucson Pops Orchestra
 University of Michigan Pops Orchestra

In the Philippines
 De La Salle University Pops Orchestra

In Argentina
 Juan de Dios Filiberto National Orchestra of Argentine Music

In Indonesia
 Twilite Orchestra

In Australia
 Australian Pops Orchestra
 Brisbane City Pops Orchestra
 Queensland Pops Orchestra

In Canada
 Vancouver Pops Orchestra

References